Chelleh Khaneh Rural District is in Sufian District of Shabestar County, East Azerbaijan province, Iran. At the National Census of 2006, its population was 7,921 in 2,056 households. There were 7,630 inhabitants in 2,215 households at the following census of 2011. At the most recent census of 2016, the population of the rural district was 7,877 in 2,447 households. The largest of its 12 villages was Garrus, with 2,002 people.

References 

Shabestar County

Rural Districts of East Azerbaijan Province

Populated places in East Azerbaijan Province

Populated places in Shabestar County